Gwiazdowo may refer to:

Gwiazdowo, Greater Poland Voivodeship (west-central Poland)
Gwiazdowo, Warmian-Masurian Voivodeship (north Poland)
Gwiazdowo, Sławno County in West Pomeranian Voivodeship (north-west Poland)
Gwiazdowo, Szczecinek County in West Pomeranian Voivodeship (north-west Poland)